Eastern Lions may refer to:

Bantu Tshintsha Guluva Rovers F.C., a football club in Zimbabwe formerly named Eastern Lions FC
Eastern Lions SC, a football club in Victoria, Australia